is a railway station on the Keisei Main Line in the town of Shisui, Chiba Japan, operated by the private railway operator Keisei Electric Railway.

Lines
Sōgosandō Station is served by the Keisei Main Line, and is 57.0 kilometers from the Tokyo terminus of the Keisei Main Line at Keisei-Ueno Station.

Station layout
Sōgosandō Station has one side platform and one island platform, serving three tracks, connected to an elevated station building.

Platforms

History
It was renamed Sōgosandō on July 1, 1951.

Station numbering was introduced to all Keisei Line stations on 17 July 2010; Sōgosandō Station was assigned station number KS38.

Passenger statistics
In fiscal 2019, the station was used by an average of 2757 passengers daily.

Surrounding area
 Tokyo Gakkan High School (Kamagata Gakuen)
 Keisei Electric Railway Training Center
 Sōgo railyards

See also
 List of railway stations in Japan

References

External links

 Keisei station layout 

Railway stations in Chiba Prefecture
Railway stations in Japan opened in 1928
Keisei Main Line
Shisui